Martin Davin (5 May 1905 – 9 November 1957) was a Scottish footballer who played for Dumbarton, Bury, Bolton Wanderers, Hull City and Airdrieonians.

References

1905 births
1957 deaths
Scottish footballers
Dumbarton F.C. players
Airdrieonians F.C. (1878) players
Bury F.C. players
Bolton Wanderers F.C. players
Scottish Football League players
English Football League players
Hull City A.F.C. players
Vale of Clyde F.C. players
Association football inside forwards